The  is a DC suburban electric multiple unit (EMU) train type operated by Central Japan Railway Company (JR Central) in Japan since 1999.

The design was introduced from spring 1999 to replace older 113 and 115 series EMUs.

Variants

313-0 series

15 x 4-car sets (60 vehicles) built by Kinki Sharyo, Nippon Sharyo, and Tokyu Car Corporation between July and September 1999 with flip-over transverse seating.

4-car Ōgaki sets Y1 to Y15

313-300 series

16 x 2-car sets (32 vehicles) built by Kinki Sharyo, Nippon Sharyo, and Tokyu Car Corporation in September 1999 with flip-over transverse seating.

2-car Ōgaki sets Y31 to Y46

313-1000 series

3 x four-car and 3 x two-car sets (21 vehicles) built by Nippon Sharyo and Tokyu Car Corporation between February and March 1999 with flip-over transverse seating.

A further seven 4-car sets, J1 to J7, were delivered from Nippon Sharyo to Ōgaki depot between August and October 2010.

A further three 4-car sets, J8 to J10, were delivered in 2014.

4-car Jinryō sets B1 to B5

B1 to B3

B4 to B5

4-car Ōgaki sets J1 to J7

3-car Jinryō sets B101 to B107

B101 to B103

B104 to B107

3-car Jinryō sets B151 to B153

Interior

313-1300 series

4 x 2-car 4th-batch sets (8 vehicles) were built by Nippon Sharyo in June 2010. The sets are numbered B401 to B404 and allocated to Jinryō depot. All cars feature flip-over transverse seating. A further four 2-car sets, numbered B501 to B504, were delivered from Nippon Sharyo to Jinryō depot on 3 August 2011.

2-car Jinryō sets B401–B404, B501–B504

313-2000 series

9 x 2-car and 27 x 3-car sets (99 vehicles) built by Kinki Sharyo and Nippon Sharyo between November 2006 and February 2007 with longitudinal seating.

2-car Shizuoka sets W1 to W9

W1–W2

W3–W9

3-car Shizuoka sets T1 to T17

3-car Shizuoka sets N1 to N10

Interior

313-3000 series

12 x 2-car and 16 x 2-car sets (56 vehicles) with fixed transverse seating and longitudinal seating.

2-car Shizuoka sets V1 to V14

V1–V12

V13–V14

2-car Jinryō sets B301 to B316

Interior

313-5000 series

12 x 6-car sets (72 vehicles) were built by Nippon Sharyo in 2006 with flip-over transverse seating. This was the first conventional (i.e. non-Shinkansen) rolling stock to feature yaw dampers between intermediate cars.

Further (4th-batch) sets were delivered in 2010.

Two cars—designated KuHa 312-5102 and MoHa 313-5402—were built in 2019 to replace KuHa 312-5002 and MoHa 313-5302, respectively. This follows an accident in which set Y102 was involved in 2017.

6-car Ōgaki sets Y101 to Y113

Interior

313-5300 series 
One 2-car 4th-batch set was delivered in July 2010 with flip-over transverse seating.

2-car Ōgaki set Z1

313-8000 series

The 313-8000 series fleet consists of six 3-car sets (18 vehicles) with flip-over transverse seating, designed for use on Chūō Main Line Central Liner and Home Liner Nakatsugawa services and built by Kinki Sharyo and Nippon Sharyo between September 1999 and February 2001. Although Central Liner services were discontinued in 2013, the trains continued to be used on Chūō Main Line local and rapid services until JR Central's 12 March 2022 timetable revision, and were transferred to Shizuoka depot from then. From 14 March of that year, the fleet was introduced onto Tōkaidō Main Line services.

3-car Jinryō sets B201 to B206

Interior 
Passenger accommodation consists of flip-over transverse seating throughout. Fixed seating bays with tables are provided at the ends of each car. Some cars are equipped with toilets.

See also
 KiHa 25, diesel multiple unit counterpart

References

External links

 JR Central 313 series information 

Central Japan Railway Company
Electric multiple units of Japan
Train-related introductions in 1999
Kinki Sharyo multiple units
Tokyu Car multiple units
Nippon Sharyo multiple units
1500 V DC multiple units of Japan